Sosnówka  is a part of the town Wałcz, within Wałcz County, West Pomeranian Voivodeship, in north-western Poland.

References

Villages in Wałcz County